The 2014–15 Valparaiso Crusaders men's basketball team represented Valparaiso University during the 2014–15 NCAA Division I men's basketball season. The Crusaders, led by fourth year head coach Bryce Drew, played their home games at the Athletics–Recreation Center and were members of the Horizon League. Valpo finished the season 28–6, 13–3 in Horizon League play to win the Horizon League regular season championship. The Crusaders defeated Cleveland State and Green Bay to win the Horizon League tournament championship. Valpo received an automatic bid to the NCAA tournament as a #13 seed and lost in the second round to Maryland.

Senior center Vashil Fernandez was the league's Defensive Player of the Year, and sophomore forward Jubril Adekoya was the Sixth Man of the Year. Bryce Drew was named the league's Coach of the Year.

Previous season
The Crusaders finished the 2013–14 season with an overall record of 18–16, 9–7 in Horizon League play to finish in fourth place. Valpo advanced to the second round of the Horizon League tournament where they lost to Milwaukee. The Crusaders were invited to the CollegeInsider.com Tournament where they lost in the first round to Columbia.

Roster

Schedule
The 2014–2015 Valparaiso University men's basketball schedule is:

|-
!colspan=9 style="background:#613318; color:#FFCC00;"| Exhibition

|-
!colspan=9 style="background:#613318; color:#FFCC00;"| Regular season

|-
!colspan=9 style="background:#613318; color:#FFCC00;"|Horizon League tournament

|-
!colspan=9 style="background:#613318; color:#FFCC00;"|NCAA tournament

References

Valparaiso
Valparaiso Beacons men's basketball seasons
Valparaiso
Valparaiso Crusaders men's basket
Valparaiso Crusaders men's basket